The Old Opera House is located in the Shenandoah Valley in Charles Town, West Virginia, once known as the New Opera House or simply The Opera House, is a restored theater, designed by T.A. Mullett of Washington, D.C., son of architect Alfred B. Mullett.  The theater opened in 1911, bringing minstrel shows, vaudeville, touring theater groups, circuses and wild west shows to Charles Town. By the 1930s a projection machine was installed, but the theater closed in 1948.  It has since re-opened as a community-supported performance space.

The building consists of a two-story street front with offices on the second floor in an old apartment building, pre-dating the theater portion by about twenty years.  The house and stage occupy the interior of the lot.

References

Theatres on the National Register of Historic Places in West Virginia
Buildings and structures in Charles Town, West Virginia
National Register of Historic Places in Jefferson County, West Virginia
Theatres completed in 1911
1911 establishments in West Virginia
Opera houses on the National Register of Historic Places
Event venues on the National Register of Historic Places in West Virginia
Opera houses in West Virginia